Mads Mensah Larsen (born 12 August 1991) is a Danish handball player for SG Flensburg-Handewitt and the Denmark national team.

He previously played for the clubs AG København, Nordsjælland Håndbold and Aalborg Håndbold.

He studied Humanistic informatics at Aalborg University. He has a Danish mother and a Ghanaian father.

In March 2020 Larsen tested positive for COVID-19.

Honours
German Championship
: 2016, 2017
: 2015
Danish Championship:
: 2012, 2013

References

External links

1991 births
Living people
Danish male handball players
Danish people of Ghanaian descent
Expatriate handball players
Danish expatriate sportspeople in Germany
Rhein-Neckar Löwen players
Handball-Bundesliga players
Aalborg Håndbold players
People from Holbæk Municipality
Olympic handball players of Denmark
Handball players at the 2016 Summer Olympics
Medalists at the 2016 Summer Olympics
Olympic gold medalists for Denmark
Olympic medalists in handball
Handball players at the 2020 Summer Olympics
Medalists at the 2020 Summer Olympics
Olympic silver medalists for Denmark
Sportspeople from Region Zealand